The 2022 Kate Sheppard Cup is New Zealand's women's 28th annual knockout football competition. This is the fifth year that the competition is known by the Kate Sheppard Cup, or New Zealand Football Foundation Kate Sheppard Cup for sponsorship purposes, after previously been known as the Women's Knockout Cup since its establishment. The cup has had thirteen different winners lift the trophy over its 28 year history with Lynn-Avon United from Auckland being the most successful and Wellington United being the current holders from the 2021 season.

The 2022 competition has four rounds before quarter-finals, semi-finals, and a final. Competition will run in three regions (northern, central/capital, southern) until the quarter-finals, from which stage the draw will be open. In all, 56 teams entered the competition this year which means the cup had a preliminary round added for the Mainland region.

Results

Preliminary
All matches were played over the Anzac weekend of 22–25 April 2022. All 6 teams in this round compete in level 3 of the Mainland Region.

Mainland Region

All teams listed below received byes to the first round.
Northern Region: Auckland United, Beachlands Maretai AFC, Birkenhead United, Eastern Suburbs, Ellerslie AFC, Fencilbles United, Franklin United, Greenhithe FC, Hisbiscus Coast, Manukau United, Manurewa AFC, North Shore United, Northern Rovers, Onehunga Sports FC, Onerahi, Takapuna AFC, Waiuku AFC, West Coast Rangers, Western Springs, Cambridge FC, Claudelands Rovers, Hamilton Wanderers, Lakes Football Club, Melville United, Otumoetai FC, Papamoa FC, Tauranga City, Waikato Unicol AFC
Central/Capital Region: Brooklyn Northern United, Waterside Karori, Kapiti Coast United, Miramar Rangers, Petone FC, Seatoun AFC, Victoria University, Wellington United, PN Marist FC, New Plymouth Rangers
Mainland Region: FC Twenty 11, Cashmere Technical, Coastal Spirit, Nomads United, Universities of Canterbury AFC
Southern Region: Dunedin City Royals, Green Island, Mosgiel AFC, Northern AFC, Otago University AFC, Queenstown AFC, Roslyn Wakari

Round 1
All matches will be played over the weekend of 14–15 May 2022. This round contained one team from level 6, Waiuku, the lowest ranked team left in the competition.

Northern Region

Central/Capital Region

Mainland Region

Southern Region

All teams listed below received byes to the second round.
Northern Region: Auckland United, Eastern Suburbs, Hamilton Wanderers, Western Springs.
Central/Capital Region: New Plymouth Rangers, Palmerston North Marist, Seatoun, Victoria University of Wellington, Waterside Karori, Wellington United.
Southern Region: Mosgiel.

Round 2
All matches were played on Queen's Birthday weekend 3-6 June 2022. This round contained 11 teams from level 3, the lowest ranked teams left in the competition.

Northern Region

Central/Capital Region

Mainland Region

Southern Region

Round 3
All matches were played on the weekend of 18–19 June 2022. This round contained two teams from level 3, Birkenhead United and Waikato Unicol, the lowest ranked teams left in the competition.

Northern Region

Central/Capital Region

Mainland

Southern Region

Quarter-finals
All of the matches will be played on the weekend 9–10 July 2022. This round contained eight teams from level 2.

Northern Region

Central/Capital Region

Mainland/Southern Region

Semi-finals
Matches were played on the weekend of the 20 August 2022.

Final
The final was played on the 11 September 2022.

Notes
The tier that teams are in (as indicated in brackets next to their name) are based on the New Zealand football league system for the 2022 season. As some teams can qualify and play in more than one league (and tier) per season, the highest tier that they take part in is the one noted next to their name.

References

External links
Women's knockout cup section on the New Zealand Football website

Women's Knockout Cup/Kate Sheppard Cup
Women's Knockout Cup
Women's Knockout Cup
New Zealand, Kate Sheppard Cup
New Zealand, Kate Sheppard Cup
Kate Sheppard Cup